Between Two Words is the second studio album by American alternative rock band Wire Train, released in 1985 by Columbia, and 415 Records. It was the first Wire Train recording with drummer Brian MacLeod. Guitarist Kurt Herr was let go during the recording sessions. Additional guitars were performed by producer Peter Maunu.

Track listing
Side one
"Last Perfect Thing" (K. Hunter) — 3:52
"Skills of Summer" (K. Hunter/K. Herr) — 4:03
"When She Was a Girl" (K. Hunter/K. Herr/T. Chauncey) — 4:27
"God on Our Side" (Bob Dylan) — 4:29
"Love Love" (K. Hunter/Wire Train) — 3:15

Side two
"I Will" (K. Hunter/K. Herr/A. Rundblad) — 4:21
"No Pretties" (K. Hunter/Wire Train) — 4:25
"The Ocean" (K. Herr) — 4:05
"Two Persons" (K. Hunter/A. Rundblad) — 2:54
"Home" (A. Rundblad) — 3:35

Personnel
Credits are adapted from the Between Two Words liner notes.
 Kevin Hunter — vocals, guitar
 Kurt Herr — vocals, guitar
 Brian MacLeod — drums
 Anders Rundblad — bass guitar, vocals
 Peter Maunu — vocals, guitar
 Peter Paul Skrepek — guitar

References

External links

1985 albums
Wire Train albums
415 Records albums